The 2016 season was São Paulo's 87th year since the club's existence. During the season São Paulo played 4 championships, 3 nationals (Campeonato Paulista, Copa do Brasil, Série A) and 1 continental (Copa Libertadores). The club took his best performance in the continental tournament reaching the semifinals being defeated by Colombian club Atlético Nacional in two legs (0–2 Home; 1–2 Away). In Campeonato Paulista, championship of State of São Paulo, Tricolor fall in the quarterfinals against Audax, losing the single leg in the opponent's home. Playing the national cup, Copa do Brasil, The Dearest was eliminated by Juventude in away goal rule after an aggregated final score of 2–2 (1–2 Home; 1–0 Away). São Paulo ended the year reaching the 10th place in the league with the same number of wins, 14, and 10 draws. A fewer weeks after the end of Copa Libertadores, the Argentine head coach, Edgardo Bauza was chosen by Argentine Football Association to lead the National Team, leaving the club at the beginning of August.

Players

Reserve players

Out on loan

Transfers

In

Out

Statistics

Appearances and goals

|-
|colspan="14" style="text-align:center;" |Players who are on loan/left São Paulo this season:

|}

Top scorers

Disciplinary record
{| class="wikitable" style="font-size: 95%; text-align: center;"
|-
! rowspan="2"  style="width:5%;"| 
! rowspan="2"  style="width:5%;"| 
! rowspan="2"  style="width:5%;"| 
! rowspan="2" style="width:15%;"| Player
! colspan="3" | Campeonato Paulista
! colspan="3" | Copa Libertadores
! colspan="3" | Campeonato Brasileiro
! colspan="3" | Copa do Brasil
! colspan="3" | Total
|-
!  style="width:60px; background:#fe9;"| 
!  style="width:60px; background:#ff8888;"|
!  style="width:60px; background:#ff8888;"|
!  style="width:60px; background:#fe9;"|
!  style="width:60px; background:#ff8888;"|
!  style="width:60px; background:#ff8888;"|
!  style="width:60px; background:#fe9;"|
!  style="width:60px; background:#ff8888;"|
!  style="width:60px; background:#ff8888;"|
!  style="width:60px; background:#fe9;"|
!  style="width:60px; background:#ff8888;"|
!  style="width:60px; background:#ff8888;"|
!  style="width:60px; background:#fe9;"|
!  style="width:60px; background:#ff8888;"|
!  style="width:60px; background:#ff8888;"|
|-
|GK
|
|1
|Denis
|0
|0
|0
|0
|1
|0
|0
|0
|0
|0
|0
|0
|0
|1
|0
|-
|DF
|
|2
|Bruno
|4
|0
|0
|3
|0
|0
|1
|0
|0
|0
|0
|0
|8
|0
|0
|-
|DF
|
|3
|Rodrigo Caio
|0
|0
|0
|2
|0
|0
|0
|0
|0
|0
|0
|0
|2
|0
|0
|-
|DF
|
|4
|Lucão
|2
|0
|0
|0
|0
|0
|0
|0
|0
|0
|0
|0
|2
|0
|0
|-
|DF
|
|5
|Diego Lugano
|2
|0
|0
|1
|0
|0
|3
|1
|0
|0
|0
|0
|6
|1
|0
|-
|DF
|
|6
|Carlinhos
|1
|0
|0
|1
|0
|0
|1
|0
|0
|0
|0
|0
|3
|0
|0
|-
|MF
|
|7
|Michel Bastos
|2
|0
|0
|2
|0
|0
|1
|0
|0
|0
|0
|0
|5
|0
|0
|-
|MF
|
|8
|Daniel
|0
|0
|0
|0
|0
|0
|0
|0
|0
|0
|0
|0
|0
|0
|0
|-
|MF
|
|10
|Paulo Henrique Ganso
|4
|0
|0
|2
|0
|0
|2
|0
|0
|0
|0
|0
|8
|0
|0
|-
|MF
|
|11
|Wesley
|0
|0
|0
|1
|0
|0
|1
|0
|0
|0
|0
|0
|2
|0
|0
|-
|FW
|
|12
|Jonathan Calleri
|3
|0
|0
|5
|0
|1
|3
|1
|0
|0
|0
|0
|11
|1
|1
|-
|MF
|
|13
|Christian Cueva
|0
|0
|0
|0
|0
|0
|1
|0
|0
|0
|0
|0
|1
|0
|0
|-
|FW
|
|14
|Alan Kardec
|4
|0
|0
|1
|0
|0
|1
|0
|0
|0
|0
|0
|6
|0
|0
|-
|MF
|
|15
|João Schmidt
|1
|0
|0
|0
|1
|0
|0
|0
|0
|0
|0
|0
|1
|1
|0
|-
|DF
|
|16
|Mateus Caramelo
|2
|0
|0
|2
|0
|0
|1
|0
|0
|0
|0
|0
|5
|0
|0
|-
|DF
|
|18
|Breno
|1
|0
|0
|0
|0
|0
|0
|0
|0
|0
|0
|0
|1
|0
|0
|-
|DF
|
|19
|Lyanco
|0
|0
|0
|0
|0
|0
|0
|0
|0
|0
|0
|0
|0
|0
|0
|-
|FW
|
|20
|Ricardo Centurión
|0
|0
|0
|1
|0
|1
|0
|0
|0
|0
|0
|0
|1
|0
|1
|-
|DF
|
|21
|Eugenio Mena
|3
|0
|0
|2
|0
|0
|0
|0
|0
|0
|0
|0
|5
|0
|0
|-
|GK
|
|22
|Renan Ribeiro
|0
|0
|0
|0
|0
|0
|0
|0
|0
|0
|0
|0
|0
|0
|0
|-
|MF
|
|23
|Thiago Mendes
|2
|1
|0
|1
|0
|0
|3
|0
|0
|0
|0
|0
|6
|1
|0
|-
|GK
|
|24
|Léo
|0
|0
|0
|0
|0
|0
|0
|0
|0
|0
|0
|0
|0
|0
|0
|-
|MF
|
|25
|Hudson
|3
|0
|0
|2
|0
|0
|2
|0
|0
|0
|0
|0
|7
|0
|0
|-
|DF
|
|26
|Auro Jr.
|0
|0
|0
|0
|0
|0
|0
|0
|0
|0
|0
|0
|0
|0
|0
|-
|DF
|
|27
|Maicon
|2
|0
|0
|3
|0
|0
|2
|0
|0
|0
|0
|0
|7
|0
|0
|-
|DF
|
|28
|Matheus Reis
|0
|0
|0
|0
|0
|0
|1
|0
|0
|0
|0
|0
|1
|0
|0
|-
|MF
|
|29
|Lucas Fernandes
|3
|0
|0
|0
|0
|0
|1
|0
|0
|0
|0
|0
|4
|0
|0
|-
|FW
|
|30
|Kelvin
|0
|0
|0
|2
|0
|0
|1
|0
|0
|0
|0
|0
|3
|0
|0
|-
|FW
|
|31
|Luiz Araújo
|0
|0
|0
|0
|0
|0
|0
|0
|0
|0
|0
|0
|0
|0
|0
|-
|MF
|
|32
|Matheus Banguelê
|0
|0
|0
|0
|0
|0
|1
|0
|0
|0
|0
|0
|1
|0
|0
|-
|MF
|
|33
|Artur
|0
|0
|0
|0
|0
|0
|0
|0
|0
|0
|0
|0
|0
|0
|0
|-
|FW
|
|37
|Ytalo
|0
|0
|0
|0
|0
|0
|0
|0
|0
|0
|0
|0
|0
|0
|0
|-
|colspan="19"|Players who are on loan/left São Paulo this season:
|-
|FW
|
|9
|Kieza
|0
|0
|0
|0
|0
|0
|0
|0
|0
|0
|0
|0
|0
|0
|0
|-
|FW
|
|13
|Wilder Guisao
|1
|0
|0
|0
|0
|0
|1
|0
|0
|0
|0
|0
|2
|0
|0
|-
|DF
|
|16
|Reinaldo
|0
|0
|0
|0
|0
|0
|0
|0
|0
|0
|0
|0
|0
|0
|0
|-
|FW
|
|17
|Rogério
|0
|0
|0
|0
|0
|0
|0
|0
|0
|0
|0
|0
|0
|0
|0
|-
| colspan=4 | TOTAL
|40
|1
|0
|31
|2
|2
|27
|2
|0
|0
|0
|0
|98
|5
|2
|-

Clean sheets
Includes all competitive matches. The list is sorted by shirt number when total clean sheets are equal.

Last updated on 6 November

Managers performance

Overview
{|class="wikitable"
|-
|Games played || 70 (16 Campeonato Paulista, 14 Copa Libertadores, 38 Campeonato Brasileiro, 2 Copa do Brasil)
|-
|Games won || 26 (6 Campeonato Paulista, 5 Copa Libertadores, 14 Campeonato Brasileiro, 1 Copa do Brasil)
|-
|Games drawn || 18 (4 Campeonato Paulista, 4 Copa Libertadores, 10 Campeonato Brasileiro, 0 Copa do Brasil)
|-
|Games lost || 26 (6 Campeonato Paulista, 5 Copa Libertadores, 14 Campeonato Brasileiro, 1 Copa do Brasil)
|-
|Goals scored || 85
|-
|Goals conceded || 71
|-
|Goal difference || +14
|-
|Clean sheets || 22
|-
|Worst discipline || Diego Lugano (14 , 2 )
|-
|Best result || 6–0 (H) v Trujillanos – Copa Libertadores
|-
|Worst result || 1–4 (A) v Audax – Campeonato Paulista 
|-
|Most appearances || Denis (68)
|-
|Top scorer || Jonathan Calleri (16)
|-

Friendlies

Competitions

Campeonato Paulista

Results summary

Group C

First stage

Knockout stage

Copa Libertadores

Results Summary

First stage

Group stage

Knockout stage

Round of 16

Quarterfinals

Semifinals

Campeonato Brasileiro

Results summary

Results by round

Matches

Copa do Brasil

Results Summary

Round of 16

References

External links
official website 

São Paulo FC seasons
Sao Paulo F.C.